Kurthuwa is a village panchayat located in the Azamgarh district of Uttar-Pradesh state, India. The Tehsil for this panchayat is Phulpur. Lucknow is the state capital for Kurthuwa village. It is located around 233.2 kilometer away from Kurthuwa.

The other nearest state capital from Kurthuwa is Patna and its distance is 127.1 km. The other surrounding state capitals are Patna 234.9 km., Ranchi 378.3 km., Gangtok 600.3 km.

Kurthuwa is surrounded by Mirzapur Tehsil towards East, Dharma Pur Tehsil towards South, Thekma Tehsil towards East, Karanja Kala Tehsil towards west.

Language of Kurthuwa 
The native language of Village Kurthuwa is Hindi, Urdu, Bhojpuri and most of the people are able to speak and understand Hindi, Urdu. Kurthuwa people use Hindi/Bhojpuri language for general communication.

Nearest Railway station

Nearest Airport

Nearby villages 
Nearby Villages of Kurthuwa
 Sonhara
 Ajaur
 Kamalpur
 Barra
 Chiksanwa
 Chaktek Chand
 Chak Patti
 Bairi
 Barauna
 Adhawal
 Lalan Garha

Caste and People 
Kurthuwa village of Azamgarh has substantial population of Schedule Caste. Schedule Caste (SC) constitutes 34.05% of total population in Kurthuwa village. The village Kurthuwa currently doesn't have any Schedule Tribe (ST) population.

Villages in Azamgarh district